Del Norte may refer to:

Places
Del Norte (airport), Monterrey, Mexico
Del Norte, California
Del Norte, Colorado
Del Norte BART, a transit hub in El Cerrito, California
Del Norte County, California
Mall del Norte, in Laredo, Texas

Other uses
Del Norte salamander (Plethodon elongatus)
Del Norte Titan, a tree

See also
Del Norte High School (disambiguation)